Ferdinand, Prince of Asturias (4 December 1571 – 18 October 1578) was a member of the House of Habsburg who was heir apparent to the Spanish throne.

Biography 

Ferdinand was born in the Royal Alcázar of Madrid. He was the second son of Philip II of Spain. His mother was Philip II's niece and fourth wife, Anna of Austria. His elder half-brother, Don Carlos, had died in 1568, which meant that he was the new heir-apparent at birth and therefore Prince of Asturias. Most of his time was spent with his mother, his nurses and his two elder half sisters Catherine and Isabella. To thank God for the birth of the long-awaited son, prisoners were released – as commemorated in Titian's painting, Philip II Offering Don Fernando to Victory.

On 31 May 1573, Ferdinand was officially made Prince of Asturias at San Jerónimo el Real.

Ferdinand died of dysentery. His father was eventually succeeded by his youngest brother, Philip III of Spain.

 

1571 births
1578 deaths
16th-century House of Habsburg
Princes of Asturias
Dukes of Montblanc
Heirs apparent who never acceded
Children of Philip II of Spain
Burials in the Pantheon of Infantes at El Escorial
Royalty and nobility who died as children
Sons of kings